Promised Land is the fifth studio album by the American heavy metal band Queensrÿche and their highest charting record to date. It was released by EMI on October 18, 1994, four years after their successful Empire album. The album was re-released on June 10, 2003, in a remastered edition with bonus tracks.

Song overview

The album opens with "9.28 a.m.", a musique concrète sequence put together by drummer Scott Rockenfield. The band wanted to create a cinematic and moody intro, and Rockenfield was given complete freedom to make something. Rockenfield recorded natural sounds using a portable ADAT tape recorder, which he processed through a rack of effects and designed his own sound effects out of it. Some of the recorded sounds appear on other tracks, such as the sound of a train on "Disconnected". "9.28 a.m." follows a soul from death through the ether into a reincarnation, and rebirth, followed by the sound of a crying baby. The title refers to the time Rockenfield was born.

"9.28 a.m." segues into "I Am I". This song is driven by a heavy riff and Geoff Tate's vocals to a background of percussion instruments. Chris DeGarmo performs cello and sitar parts as well as the guitar solo. After almost four minutes it merges into "Damaged", a straightforward heavy rocker.

"Out of Mind" and the subsequent "Bridge" are quiet acoustic pieces, with lyrics written by Chris DeGarmo. The last one deals with the relationship with his father, who died during the Promised Land sessions.

The eight-minute title track is the first track in the Queensrÿche catalogue to be credited to the entire group. It is a dark piece, full of Rockenfield tape effects, DeGarmo/Wilton twin guitar work, and marks Tate's first appearance as a saxophonist. On this track, the theme deals with the drawbacks of success. It ends in a bar scene of people talking and drinking (slightly reminiscent of the ending of "Welcome to the Machine" on Pink Floyd's Wish You Were Here, which deals with a similar subject matter). These sound effects merge into "Disconnected," an alienating piece dealing with American consumer society. It features Tate on sax again.

The subsequent "Lady Jane" deals with the similar theme of the influence of commercials. It is a ballad featuring DeGarmo on piano and another twin solo.

"My Global Mind" is another rock song dealing with globalization. After that, "One More Time" is an acoustic rocker, with lyrics in the vein of the title track.

The album's final track, "Someone Else?", only features Tate on vocals and DeGarmo on piano.

Legacy
In July 2014, Guitar World ranked Promised Land at number 23 in their "Superunknown: 50 Iconic Albums That Defined 1994" list.

Track listing
All credits adapted from the original liner notes.

Personnel
Queensrÿche
Geoff Tate – vocals, saxophone, keyboards
Chris DeGarmo – lead & rhythm guitar, piano, cello, sitar
Michael Wilton – lead & rhythm guitar
Eddie Jackson – bass guitar
Scott Rockenfield – drums, percussion, tape effects

Production
Queensrÿche - producers, engineers, mixing at Bad Animals Studio, Seattle, Summer 1994
James Barton – producer, engineer, mixing
Phil Brown – assistant to the producer
Tom Hall – engineer
Eric Fischer – assistant engineer
Matt Gruber – mixing assistant
Don Tyler - digital editing
Stephen Marcussen – mastering
Hugh Syme – art direction, design, illustrations

Charts

Certifications

References

Queensrÿche albums
1994 albums
EMI Records albums
Albums produced by James Barton (producer)